Folkestone is a town and seaside resort in Kent, England. The following is a list of those people who were either born or live in Folkestone, or had some important contribution to make to the town.

Notable people from Folkestone


A
William de Wiveleslie Abney (1843–1920) astronomer, chemist, and photographer
Les Ames (1905–1990) cricketer
Richard Ashworth (born 1947) Member of European Parliament

B
Julian Baggini (born 1968) philosopher and writer
Mark Barham (born 1962) association footballer
Peter Barkworth (1929–2006) actor
Graham Barlow (born 1950) cricketer
Michael Bentine (1922–1996) comedian: The Goon Show 
Lesley Brook (1917–2009) actress
Arthur Brough (1922–1980) actor (Are You Being Served?); established Folkestone Repertory Theatre

C
John Henry Challis (1809–1880) philanthropist
Fred Cheesmur (1908–1987) association footballer
Jack Coggins (1911–2006) artist
Wilkie Collins (1824–1889)
A. E. Coppard (1878–1957) short story writer
Bithia Mary Croker (c. 1848–1920) Irish-born novelist

D
John Dartnell (1838–1913), Commandant of the Natal Mounted Police 
Michael Dillon (1915–1962) physician; first trans man to undergo phalloplasty
John Doogan (1853–1940) Irish recipient of the Victoria Cross
Roy Douglas (1907–2015) composer and arranger

E
John Eric Erichsen (1818–1896) surgeon
Eamon Everall (born 1948) artist, educator, founding member of Stuckism Art Movement

F
Thomas Field (1855–1936) Church of England priest

G
George Gardiner (1935–2002) politician
Carl Gilbert (born 1948) association footballer
Jonathan Gledhill (born 1949) Bishop of Lichfield
Kitty Gordon (1878–1974) actress
George Grossmith (1847–1912) comedian, writer, etc. collaborating with Gilbert and Sullivan on several operas

H
William Halcrow (1883–1958) civil engineer 
Radclyffe Hall (1880–1943) author
William Hall-Jones (1851–1936) Prime Minister of New Zealand
Augustus Harris (1852–1896) actor, impresario and dramatist
Charlotte Harris (born 1981) portrait artist
William Harvey (1578–1657) physician (discoverer of blood circulation)
Norman Heatley (1911–2004) scientist
Michael Hogben (born 1952) auctioneer, antiques dealer
Billy Hughes (born 1960) footballer
Charles Bousfield Huleatt (1863–1908) missionary; discoverer of important papyrus documents
Jessica Hynes (Born 1972) Bafta winning actress

I
Peter Imbert (born 1933) senior police officer

J
Michael Jack (born 1946) politician
Hattie Jacques (1924–1980) comedy actress; Carry On films

K
Alice Keppel (1868–1947) mistress of King Edward VII; great-grandmother of Camilla, Duchess of Cornwall
Pete Kircher (born 1945) rock/pop drummer
William Knox (1850–1913) Australian politician and businessman

L
Roderick Alastair Brook Learoyd (1913–1995) Victoria Cross recipient
Mabel Love (1874–1953) dancer, actress

M
Francis MacKinnon (1848–1947) Test cricketer
Mary Martin (1907–1969) sculptor
Charles McCausland (1898–1965) cricketer
Patrick McHale (1826–1866) Irish recipient of Victoria Cross
Yehudi Menuhin (1916–1999) violinist; founder of Yehudi Menuhin International Competition for Young Violinists held in Folkestone
Helena Millais (1886-1970) comedienne and actress

N
Paul Nicholas (born 1945) actor and singer

P

Sam Pepper (born 1989) Big Brother 2010 contestant.
Edith Pechey (1845–1908) one of the first United Kingdom Women doctors.
John Philipot (1588–1645) College of Arms.
Samuel Plimsoll (1824–1898) politician and social reformer; the "Plimsoll line”.
Mavis Pugh (1914–2006) comedy actress.

Q
Len Quested (1925–2012) association footballer

R
Noel Redding (1945–2003) musician; bass player with The Jimi Hendrix Experience
Ricky Reina (born 1971) association footballer
Baker Russell (1837–1911) senior army officer

S
Marcus Sarjeant (born 1964) attempted murderer of Queen Elizabeth II
Blaine Sexton (1892–1966) ice hockey player 
Brendan Sheerin (born 1959) travel guide and coach-trip host
Sheila Sherlock (1918–2001) physician and hepatologist
Gerald Sinstadt (born 1930) sports commentator
Susan Spain-Dunk (1880-1962) composer, conductor and violinist
Anne Stallybrass (1938–2021) actress
Sydney Sturgess (1915–1999) Canadian actress

T
Phil Tate (1922–2005) dance bandleader
Cliff Temple (1948–1994) sports journalist
Thunderstick (living) heavy rock musician; drummer
David Tomlinson (1917–2000) actor
Arthur Tooth (1839–1931) Ritualist priest; curate of St Mary's Folkestone
Walter Tull (1888–1918) first black infantry officer in British Army; football (soccer) player

U
Ernest Ewart Unwin (1881–1944) educationist

V
Phil Vickery (born 1961) celebrity chef

W
Weller brothers (born 1802, 1805, 1814) were the founders of a whaling station on Otago Harbour, New Zealand. Their name lives on in the sea shanty Soon May the Wellerman Come.
Chris Wills (born 1978), game show contestant
Dave Wiltshire (born 1954), association footballer

References

People from Folkestone
Folkestone